Hammerbrücke is a village and a former municipality in the Vogtlandkreis district, in Saxony, Germany. Since 1 October 2009, it is part of the municipality Muldenhammer.

Former municipalities in Saxony
Vogtlandkreis